Apoptosis signal-regulating kinase 1 (ASK1) also known as mitogen-activated protein kinase 5 (MAP3K5) is a member of MAP kinase family and as such a part of mitogen-activated protein kinase pathway. It activates c-Jun N-terminal kinase (JNK) and p38 mitogen-activated protein kinases in a Raf-independent fashion in response to an array of stresses such as oxidative stress, endoplasmic reticulum stress and calcium influx. ASK1 has been found to be involved in cancer, diabetes, rheumatoid arthritis, cardiovascular and neurodegenerative diseases.

MAP3K5 gene coding for the protein is located on chromosome 6 at locus 6q22.33. and the transcribed protein contains 1,374 amino acids with 11 kinase subdomains. Northern blot analysis shows that MAP3K5 transcript is abundant in human heart and pancreas.

Mechanism of activation 

Under nonstress conditions ASK1 is oligomerized (a requirement for its activation) through its C-terminal coiled-coil domain (CCC), but remains in an inactive form by the suppressive effect of reduced thioredoxin (Trx) and calcium and integrin binding protein 1 (CIB1). Trx inhibits ASK1 kinase activity by direct binding to its N-terminal coiled-coil domain (NCC). Trx and CIB1 regulate ASK1 activation in a redox- or calcium- sensitive manner, respectively. Both appear to compete with TNF-α receptor-associated factor 2 (TRAF2), an ASK1 activator. TRAF2 and TRAF6 are then recruited to ASK1 to form a larger molecular mass complex. Subsequently, ASK1 forms homo-oligomeric interactions not only through the CCC, but also the NCC, which leads to full activation of ASK1 through autophosphorylation at threonine 845.

ASK1 gene transcription can be induced by inflammatory cytokines such as IL-1 and TNF-α through the activation of the NF-kb protein RelA. Interestingly, TNF-α is also able to stabilize the ASK1 protein through deubiquitination. Thus, unlike other members of the mitogen-activated protein kinase family, the regulation of ASK1 expression is transcriptional as well as post-transcriptional.

Interactions 

ASK1 has been shown to interact with:

 C-Raf, 
 CDC25A, 
 DAXX, 
 DUSP19,
 EIF2AK2, 
 GADD45B, 
 HSPA1A, 
 MAP2K6, 
 MAP3K7 and 
 MAPK8IP3, 
 PDCD6, 
 PPP5C,
 RB1CC1, 
 TRAF2, 
 TRAF5,  and
 TRAF6.

References

External links

Further reading 

 
 
 
 
 
 
 
 
 
 
 
 
 
 
 
 

Programmed cell death
EC 2.7.11
Apoptosis